Florida's Government in the Sunshine Law, commonly called the Sunshine Law,  passed in 1967. It requires that all meetings of any state, county, or municipal board or commission in Florida be open to the public, and declares that actions taken at closed meetings are not binding (Section 286.011, Florida Statutes). "Meeting" is construed broadly, and is not confined to "formal" assemblages at which a ritualistic vote takes place. The legislature intended to make open the entire decision-making process by the enactment of the Sunshine Law.

Exemptions to the Sunshine Law are few. The Sunshine Review Act of 1995 applies to meetings. According to that Act, an exemption must fit within one of three categories of identifiable public purposes, and must be seen as compelling enough to override a strong presumption of openness (Section 119.15(2), Florida Statutes).

References

Florida law
Freedom of information legislation in the United States